Franco Mignini (25 October 1921 – 14 June 1987) was a Venezuelan sports shooter. He competed in the trap event at the 1956 Summer Olympics.

References

External links
 

1921 births
1987 deaths
Venezuelan male sport shooters
Olympic shooters of Venezuela
Shooters at the 1956 Summer Olympics